The 2011 Acropolis Rally was the seventh round of the 2011 World Rally Championship season. The rally took place over 17–19 June, and was based in Loutraki,  outside the country's capital, Athens. The rally was also the fourth round of the Super 2000 World Rally Championship. The Acropolis Rally returned to the WRC calendar for the first time since 2009, after the event was not run in 2010.

Sébastien Ogier took his third victory in five starts, having overtaken team-mate Sébastien Loeb on the final day of the event. Ogier's winning margin was 10.5 seconds, with Mikko Hirvonen a further three seconds behind in third place. Juho Hänninen claimed SWRC honours with an overall eighth-place finish.

Results

Event standings

Special stages

Power Stage
The "Power stage" was a live, televised  stage at the end of the rally, held in Loutraki.

References

External links
 Results at eWRC.com

Acropolis
Acropolis
Acropolis Rally